Cold Spring Harbor can refer to:

Cold Spring Harbor (album), Billy Joel's first solo album, released in 1971
Cold Spring Harbor (novel), a 1986 novel by Richard Yates
Cold Spring Harbor, New York, a hamlet on Long Island
Cold Spring Harbor (LIRR station), a station on the Long Island Railroad

See also
Cold Spring Harbor Laboratory, a genetics laboratory
Cold Spring Harbor Jr./Sr. High School